Ch Naseer Ahmad Bhutta is Special Assistant to Prime Minister  of Pakistan  on Legal Affairs with effect from 5 December 2017, directly appointed by the PM Shahid Khaqan Abbasi. He is also a senior advocate of the Supreme Court and was a Member of the Pakistan National Assembly from NA-127 from 2008 to 2013 Lahore. He belongs to the Pakistan Muslim League (Nawaz) and is the president of its lawyers' forum. He was actively involved in leading the Lawyers' Movement against Pervez Musharraf's government for the restoration of the judiciary. He was appointed as the Additional Attorney General of Pakistan in October 2013 through orders of the Prime Minister and now he resigned from the post of Additional Attorney General and president of PML-N Lawyers Forum and appointed as Chief Information Commissioner Punjab. He belongs to a well known Bhutta Arain family of Punjab.

Special Assistant to Prime Minister
He was appointed Special Assistant to Prime Minister Shahid Khaqan Abbasi in 2017 to look after legal issues, Lawyers issues and Law Officers and remained there till new general election of 2018.

Member National Assembly

He was elected as a member National Assembly from NA-127 Lahore for the term 2008–2013 to represent Pakistan Muslim League N and remained member of opposition benches while Peoples party was in power and Yousaf Raza Gillani was prime minister.

President Muslim League Lawyers Forum
He appointed President Pakistan Muslim League N Lawyers forum to mobilize legal fraternity.

Information Commissioner
He was appointed information Commissioner by  Government of the Punjab. Information Commission is an independent enforcement body constituted  under the Punjab Transparency & Right to Information Act, 2013. He is responsible to make available required mechanisms for right to information, raise awareness, help public bodies to act with, train officers and  decide public complaints.

References

Pakistan Muslim League (N) politicians
Politicians from Lahore
Living people
Pakistani lawyers
Lawyers from Lahore
Year of birth missing (living people)
Pakistani MNAs 2008–2013